Caicara or Caiçara may refer to:

People
 Caiçaras, the traditional population of the coastal regions of the southeast and south of Brazil
 Júnior Caiçara (born 1989), Brazilian footballer

Places

Brazil
 Caiçaras Club, a private club on the island of Caiçara in Rodrigo de Freitas Lagoon, Rio de Janeiro, Brazil
 Caiçara do Norte, municipality in the state of Rio Grande do Norte, Brazil
 Caiçara do Rio do Vento, municipality in the state of Rio Grande do Norte, Brazil
 Caiçara, Rio Grande do Sul, a municipality in the state of Rio Grande do Sul, Brazil
 Caiçara, Paraíba, a municipality in the state of Paraíba, Brazil
 Caiçara Esporte Clube, a Brazilian football (soccer) club

Venezuela
 Caicara de Maturín, municipal seat of Cedeño Municipality, Monagas
 Caicara del Orinoco, municipal seat of Cedeño Municipality, Bolivar

Film
 Caiçara (film), a 1950 Brazilian film by Adolfo Celi

See also
 Viola caiçara, a guitar-like stringed instrument from Brazil

de:Caicara
it:Caicara
nl:Caicara